Dermot P. Kelleher FMedSci is the Dean of the Faculty of Medicine and Vice-President, Health at the University of British Columbia in Vancouver, Canada.

He moved to UBC in August 2015. He was subsequently appointed as UBC's inaugural Vice-President, Health in June 2018. Previously Kelleher was Dean of the Faculty of Medicine at Imperial College London. He took up this role on 1 October 2012. From 2006 until 2012 he was Head of the School of Medicine and Vice-Provost for Medical Affairs at Trinity College, Dublin. He was one of the three founders of Opsona Therapeutics in 2004; Opsona's research is primarily focused on the role of toll-like receptors (TLRs) and TLR signalling in human innate immunity.

Research and career
Kelleher's major interest is in the biology of the gastrointestinal immune system and in the interaction between this system and epithelial biology. Hence the research has direct implications for the study of inflammatory diseases of the gastrointestinal tract including coeliac disease and Helicobacter pylori (H. pylori) infection. The research projects within the group focus on the normal functioning of the T-lymphocyte and its role in intestinal inflammation. Gastrointestinal inflammation is under immunogenetic control and the genetics of coeliac disease are also a focus of the group. Specific research topics include:

 Signalling role of adhesion molecules on both peripheral and intestinal lymphocytes.
 Interactions between H. pylori and the gastrointestinal epithelium.
 Vaccine development for H. pylori infection. Immunogenetics of gastrointestinal and liver disease.

In 2004, he co-founded Opsona Therapeutics with Kingston Mills and Luke O'Neill.

Milestones
 Characterisation of biochemical mechanisms involved in integrin-mediated lymphocyte migration, a potential target for new therapeutic strategies.
 Identification of mechanisms whereby H. pylori protects itself from antibody attacks.
 Development and patenting of H. pylori vaccine, which has been licensed to Chiron Corporation.
 Characterisation of immunogenetics of Hepatitis C viral clearance.

Professional attachments

 Irish Society of Gastroenterology
 Irish Society for Immunology
 American Association for the Advancement of Science
 American Gastroenterological Association
 American Society for Biochemistry and Molecular Biology
 Biochemical Society
 Society for Mucosal Immunology
 Irish Association for Cancer Research
 Fellow, Royal College of Physicians of Ireland
 Fellow, Royal College of Physicians, London
 Fellow, Royal Academy of Medicine in Ireland
 Fellow of the Academy of Medical Sciences
 Director, Health Research Board, Ireland

References

Fellows of the Royal College of Physicians
Fellows of the Academy of Medical Sciences (United Kingdom)
Irish gastroenterologists
Irish medical researchers
Medical doctors from Dublin (city)
Academic staff of the University of British Columbia
Year of birth missing (living people)
Living people
Fellows of the American Gastroenterological Association